This page are listed the results of all of the São Paulo Carnival on year 2017.

Grupo Especial

Grupo de acesso

Grupo 1

Grupo 2

Grupo 3

Grupo 4

See also 
 Results of the 2017 Rio Carnival

References 

2017